Aboriginal Australian kinship comprises the systems of Aboriginal customary law governing social interaction relating to kinship in traditional Aboriginal cultures. It is an integral part of the culture of every Aboriginal group across Australia, and particularly important with regard to marriages between Aboriginal people.

The subsection system

Subsection systems are a unique social structure that divide all of Australian Aboriginal society into a number of groups, each of which combines particular sets of kin. In Central Australian Aboriginal English vernacular, subsections are widely known as "skins". Each subsection is given a name that can be used to refer to individual members of that group. Skin is passed down by a person's parents to their children.

The name of the groups can vary. There are systems with two such groupings (these are known as 'moieties' in kinship studies), systems with four (sections), six and eight (subsection systems). Some language groups extend this by having distinct male and female forms, giving a total of sixteen skin names, for example the Pintupi (listed below) and Warlpiri. While membership in skin groups is ideally based on blood relations, Australian Aboriginal subsection systems are classificatory, meaning that even people who are not actual blood relations are assigned to a subsection. They are also universal, meaning that every member of the society is assigned a position in the system.

Subsection systems are found in Aboriginal societies across much of Central, Western and Northern Australia. On the basis of detailed analysis and comparison of the various subsection systems and their terminologies, and in particular the apparent prefix /j-/ for male and /n-/ for female, it has been identified as a social innovation originally from the Daly River region of the Northern Territory, which then spread rapidly southwards to other groups.

Systems with two groupings (moieties)

Yolngu
The Yolŋu people of north-eastern Arnhem Land divide society (and much of the natural world) into two moieties: Dhuwa and Yirritja. Each of these is represented by people of a number of different groups (each with their own lands, languages and philosophies) through their hereditary estates – so many things are either Yirritja or Dhuwa:

{| class="wikitable"
|- bgcolor=#efefef
! Skin name
! Clan groups
|-
|Yirritja
| Gumatj, Gupapuyngu, Wangurri, Ritharrngu, Mangalili,Munyuku, Madarrpa, Warramiri, Dhalwangu, Liyalanmirri.
|-
|Dhuwa
|Rirratjingu, Galpu, Djambarrpuyngu, Golumala, Marrakulu,Marrangu, Djapu, Datiwuy, Ngaymil, Djarrwark.
|}

Fish, stone, river, sea etc., belongs to one or the other moiety. Things that are not either Dhuwa or Yirritja are called wakinŋu. Yolŋu also have a kinship system with eight subsections (four Dhuwa and four Yirritja which is what creates moiety).

Systems with four sections

Gamilaraay

The Gamilaraay language group from New South Wales have a four-section system.

{| class="wikitable"
|- bgcolor=#efefef
! Moiety
! Section name (female)
! Marries (male)
! Children
|-
| rowspan="2" |Wudhurruu
|Gabudhaa
|Yibaay
|Marrii, Maadhaa
|-
|Maadhaa
|Gambuu
|Gabii, Gabudhaa
|-
| rowspan="2" |Yangu(r)u
|Buudhaa
|Marrii
|Yibaay, Yibadhaa
|-
|Yibadhaa
|Gabii
|Gambu, Buudhaa
|}

Martuthunira

The Martuthunira language group from the Pilbara region of Western Australia have a four-section system. (The spelling l.y indicates that the letters represent two distinct phonemes, and are not a digraph).

{| class="wikitable"
|- bgcolor=#efefef
! Section name (female)
! Marries (male)
! Children
|-
|Karimarra
|Panaka
|Pal.yarri
|-
|Panaka
|Karimarra
|Purungu
|-
|Pal.yarri
|Purungu
|Karimarra
|-
|Purungu
|Pal.yarri
|Panaka
|}

Similar systems are found across most language groups in the Pilbara, though with some variation in the forms of the names. For example, speakers of Ngarla use Milangka where Martuthunira use Pal.yarri.

Alyawarra

The Alyawarre language group from Central Australia also have a four-section system, but use different terms from the Martuthunira.

{| class="wikitable"
|- bgcolor=#efefef
! Section name (female)
! Marries (male)
! Children
|-
|Kngwarriya
|Upurla
|Kimarra
|-
|Upurla
|Kngwarriya
|Pitjarra
|-
|Pitjarra
|Kimarra
|Upurla
|-
|Kimarra
|Pitjarra
|Kngwarriya
|}

Systems with eight groups (subsection systems)

Lardil
The Lardil of Mornington Island in the Gulf of Carpentaria have eight subsection groups, shown here with some of their totems:

{| class="wikitable"
|- bgcolor=#efefef
!Subsection group
!Totems
!May marry onlysubsection group
!Children will be
|-
|Balyarriny
|Black tiger shark,sea turtle
|Kamarrangi
|Buranyi
|-
|Bangariny
|Brown shark, turtle
|Yakimarr
|Ngarrijbalangi
|-
|Buranyi
|Crane, salt water, sleeping turtle
|Kangal
|Balyarriny
|-
|Burrarangi
|Lightning, rough sea,black dingo
|Ngarrijbalangi
|Kamarrangi
|-
|Kamarrangi
|Rock, pelican, brolga,red dingo
|Balyarriny
|Burrarangi
|-
|Kangal
|Barramundi,grey shark
|Buranyi
|Yakimarr
|-
|Ngarrijbalangi
|Rainbird, shooting star,egret
|Burrarangi
|Bangariny
|-
|Yakimarr
|Seagull, barramundi,grey shark
|Bangariny
|Kangal
|}

Each Lardil person belongs to one of these groups. Their paternal grandfather's subsection determines their own; so a Balyarriny man or woman will have a Balyarriny grandfather. Members of each group may only marry members of one other, specified, group.

Once a person's subsection group is known, their relationship to any other Lardil can be determined. A Ngarrijbalangi is a 'father' to a Bangariny, a 'father-in-law' to a Yakimarr and a 'son' to another Bangariny, either in a social sense or purely through linearship.

The mechanics of the Lardil skin system means that generations of males cycle back and forth between two subsections. Ngarrijbalangi is father to Bangariny and Bangariny is father to Ngarrijbalangi and similarly for the three other pairs of subsections. Generations of women, however, cycle through four subsections before arriving back at the starting point. This means that a woman has the same subsection name as her (matrilineal) great-great-grandmother.

Pintupi

The Pintupi of the Western Desert also have an eight-subsection system, made more complex by distinct forms for male and female subsection names; male forms begin with "Tj", the female forms with "N". The Warlpiri system is almost the same:

{| class="wikitable"
|- bgcolor=#efefef
!Gender
!Subsection name
!First marriage preference
!Children will be
|-
|Male
|Tjapaltjarri
|Nakamarra
|Tjungurrayi, Nungurrayi
|-
|Female
|Napaltjarri
|Tjakamarra
|Tjupurrula, Napurrula
|-
|Male
|Tjapangati
|Nampitjinpa
|Tjapanangka, Napanangka
|-
|Female
|Napangati
|Tjampitjinpa
|Tjangala, Nangala
|-
|Male
|Tjakamarra
|Napaltjarri
|Tjupurrula, Napurrula
|-
|Female
|Nakamarra
|Tjapaltjarri
|Tjungurrayi, Nungurrayi
|-
|Male
|Tjampitjinpa
|Napangati
|Tjangala, Nangala
|-
|Female
|Nampitjinpa
|Tjapangati
|Tjapanangka, Napanangka
|-
|Male
|Tjapanangka
|Napurrula
|Tjapangati, Napangati
|-
|Female
|Napanangka
|Tjupurrula
|Tjakamarra, Nakamarra
|-
|Male
|Tjungurrayi
|Nangala
|Tjapaltjarri, Napaltjarri
|-
|Female
|Nungurrayi
|Tjangala
|Tjampitjinpa, Nampitjinpa
|-
|Male
|Tjupurrula
|Napanangka
|Tjakamarra, Nakamarra
|-
|Female
|Napurrula
|Tjapanangka
|Tjapangati, Napangati
|-
|Male
|Tjangala
|Nungurrayi
|Tjampitjinpa, Nampitjinpa
|-
|Female
|Nangala
|Tjungurrayi
|Tjapaltjarri, Napaltjarri
|}

Kunwinjku
The Kunwinjku of Western Arnhem Land have a similar system; male forms begin with "Na", the female forms with "Ngal":

{| class="wikitable"
|- bgcolor=#efefef
!Gender
!Subsection name
!First marriage preference
!Second marriage preference
!First marriage children will be
!Second marriage children will be
|-
|Male
|Nabulanj
|Ngalwakadj
|Ngalkangila
|Nabangardi, Ngalbangardi
|Nakodjok, Ngalkodjok
|-
|Female
|Ngalbulanj
|Nawakadj
|Nakangila
|Nawamud, Ngalwamud
|Nawamud, Ngalwamud
|-
|Male
|Nangarridj
|Ngalkangila
|Ngalwakadj
|Nakodjok, Ngalkodjok
|Nabangardi Ngalbangardi
|-
|Female
|Ngalgarridj
|Nakangila
|Nawakadj
|Nakamarrang, Ngalkamarrang
|Nakamarrang, Ngalkamarrang
|-
|Male
|Nakamarrang
|Ngalkodjok
|Ngalbangardi
|Nawakadj, Ngalwakadj
|Nakangila Ngalkangila
|-
|Female
|Ngalkamarrang
|Nakodjok
|Nabangardi
|Nabulanj, Ngalbulanj
|Nabulanj, Ngalbulanj
|-
|Male
|Nawamud
|Ngalbangardi
|Ngalkodjok
|Nakangila, Ngalkangila
|Nawakadj, Ngalwakadj
|-
|Female
|Ngalwamud
|Nabangardi
|Nakodjok
|Nangarridj, Ngalgarridj
|Nangarridj, Ngalgarridj
|-
|Male
|Nawakadj
|Ngalbulanj
|Ngalgarridj
|Nawamud, Ngalwamud
|Nakamarrang, Ngalkamarrang
|-
|Female
|Ngalwakadj
|Nabulanj
|Nangarridj
|Nabangardi, Ngalbangardi
|Nabangardi, Ngalbangardi
|-
|Male
|Nakangila
|Ngalgarridj
|Ngalbulanj
|Nakamarrang, Ngalkammarang
|Nawamud, Ngalwamud
|-
|Female
|Ngalkangila
|Nangarridj
|Nabulanj
|Nakodjok, Ngalkodjok
|Nakodjok, Ngalkodjok
|-
|Male
|Nakodjok
|Ngalkamarrang
|Ngalwamud
|Nabulanj, Ngalbulanj
|Nangarridj, Ngalgarridj
|-
|Female
|Ngalkodjok
|Nakamarrang
|Nawamud
|Nawakadj, Ngalwakadj
|Nawakadj, Ngalwakadj
|-
|Male
|Nabangardi
|Ngalwamud
|Ngalkamarrang
|Nangarridj, Ngalgarridj
|Nabulanj, Ngalbulanj
|-
|Female
|Ngalbangardi
|Nawamud
|Nakamarrang
|Nakangila, Ngalkangila
|Nakangila, Ngalkangila
|}

Each person therefore has a patrimoiety and a matrimoiety, a father's and a mother's subsection group.

Extension of the system to non-relatives

Outsiders who have significant interaction with such groups may be given a 'skin name', commonly based on the people they have interacted with and the types of interaction.

Some common kinship terms used in Aboriginal English

The variety of English used by many Australian Aboriginal people employs kinship terms in ways that are based on their equivalents in Australian Aboriginal languages.

Aunty and uncle  are terms of address for older people, to whom the speaker may not be related. 
Brother and sister—as well as siblings this term is used to refer to children of one's mother's sister and of father's brother (cousin), just as in many indigenous languages.
Cousin-brother and cousin-sister are often used to refer to children of one's mother's sister and father's brother.
Cousin refers to children of one's father's sister and mother's brother, but may be extended to any relative of one's own generation, such as one who might share the same great-grandparent, which is a second-cousin in Aboriginal terms.
In south-east Queensland, daughter is used to refer to any woman of one's great-grandparents' generation. This is due to the cyclical nature of traditional kinship systems and mirrors usage in many Australian languages.
Father and mother include any relative of one's parents' generation, such as uncles, aunts, their own cousins and in-laws.
Grandfather and grandmother can refer to anyone of one's grandparents' generation. Grandfather can also refer to any respected elderly man, to whom the speaker may not be related.
Poison refers to a relation one is obligated to avoid. See avoidance speech.
The term second, or little bit in northern Australia, is used with a distant relative who is described using a close kinship term. For example, one's second father or little bit father is a man of one's father's generation not closely related to the speaker. Usually having a second mother is having a woman of your own mother's generation who seems to act like a mother and would most likely care for you if anything were to happen to your own parents. It is contrasted with close, near or true.
A skin or skin group is a section determined by the skin of a person's parents, and determines whom a person is eligible to marry.
Son can refer to any male of the next generation, such as nephews, just as daughter can refer to any female of the next generation, including nieces.

See also
Noongar kin systems
Warlpiri kinship

References

Further reading
 Binnion, Joan (1979) The Lardil People of Mornington Island (Student Handbook), Aboriginal Community College, Port Adelaide.
 Dousset, Laurent, 2011, Australian Aboriginal Kinship: An introductory handbook with particular emphasis on the Western Desert, Marseille, Pacific-credo Publications.
 Hansen, Kenneth C. and Lesley E. Hansen, 1979, Pintupi/Luritja kinship, Alice Springs, Northern Territory, Institute for Aboriginal Development.

External links

 AustKin

Ausanthrop kinship tutorial
Ausanthrop

Kinship
Anthropology
Marriage, unions and partnerships in Australia